The name Cora has been used for one tropical cyclone in the Atlantic Ocean, eight in the western Pacific, and one in the South Pacific.

Cora was used for one tropical cyclone in the Atlantic:

Hurricane Cora (1978), after crossing Central America into the Pacific Ocean, the system reformed and became Hurricane Kristy

Cora was used for seven tropical cyclones in the Western Pacific and one in the Central Pacific:

Typhoon Cora (1953) (T5320)
Hurricane Cora (1958), formed in the Central Pacific
Typhoon Cora (1961) (T6105, 20W)
Typhoon Cora (1964) (T6406, 08W, Huaning), peaked as a Category 5 super typhoon; made landfall in the Philippines as a tropical storm
Typhoon Cora (1966) (T6618, 18W), Category 5 super typhoon; struck the Ryūkyū Islands
Typhoon Cora (1969) (T6909, 09W, Ibiang), struck southern Japan
Typhoon Cora (1972) (T7215, 16W)
Typhoon Cora (1975) (T7513, 15W, Luding)

Cora was used for one tropical cyclone in the South Pacific:
Cyclone Cora (1998), some damage to Tonga

Atlantic hurricane set index articles
Pacific hurricane set index articles
Pacific typhoon set index articles
South Pacific cyclone set index articles